Chamtar is a town and union council of Mardan District in Khyber Pakhtunkhwa province of Pakistan. It is located at 34°10'47N 71°59'2E and has an altitude of 286 metres (941 feet).

References

Union councils of Mardan District
Populated places in Mardan District